Muncq-Nieurlet is a commune in the Pas-de-Calais department in the Hauts-de-France region of France.

Geography
Munczq-Nieurlet lies about 9 miles (14 km) northwest of Saint-Omer, at the D217 and D219 crossroads.

Population

Places of interest
 The church of St. Joseph, dating from the nineteenth century.

See also
Communes of the Pas-de-Calais department

References

Muncqnieurlet